The Little River, a perennial river that is part of the Hawkesbury-Nepean catchment, is located in the Southern Highlands region of New South Wales, Australia.

Course and features
The Little River rises north of the locality of Hilltop and west of the Hume Freeway near Bargo, and flows generally north northeast and then north northwest, before reaching its confluence with the Nattai River south of the locality of Nattai. The river descends  over its  course.

The river flows through the Nattai National Park and is a source of water for the Sydney region.

See also 

 List of rivers of New South Wales (L–Z)
 List of rivers of Australia
 Rivers of New South Wales

References

External links
 

Rivers of New South Wales
Southern Highlands (New South Wales)
Wollondilly Shire